The 1994–95 Football League Cup (known as the Coca-Cola Cup for sponsorship reasons) was the 35th Football League Cup, a knockout competition for England's top 92 football clubs.

Liverpool won the competition, beating Bolton Wanderers 2–1 in the final at Wembley.

First round
56 of the First, Second and Third Division clubs compete from the First Round. Each section is divided equally into a pot of seeded clubs and a pot of unseeded clubs. Clubs' rankings depend upon their finishing position in the 1993–94 season.

First leg

Second leg

Second round
First leg matches were played on 20 and 21 September, eight-second leg matches were played on 27 and 28 September, whilst the other second leg matches were played on 4 and 5 October.

First leg

Second leg

Third round
Most matches in the third round were played on 25 and 26 October with 3 replays being played on 9 November.

Ties

Replays

Fourth round
All fourth round matches were played on 30 November with one replay being played on 21 December.

Ties

Replay

Quarter finals
The four quarter final matches were played on 11 January.

Semi-finals
The semi-final draw was made after the conclusion of the quarter finals. Unlike the other rounds, the semi-final ties were played over two legs, with each team playing one leg at home and one away.

Swindon Town were heading for a second successive relegation in Division One but their fans were given hope of silverware when they beat Bolton Wanderers 2–1 in the semi-final first leg. However, their dreams were ended in the second leg when they lost 3–1 and the Greater Manchester side reached a domestic cup final for the first time in 37 years. Four time winners Liverpool defeated Crystal Palace, another relegation threatened side, in the other semi-final.

First leg

Second leg

Bolton won 4–3 on aggregate

Liverpool won 2–0 on aggregate

Final

References

General

Specific

EFL Cup seasons
1994–95 domestic association football cups
Lea
Cup